An election to Kerry County Council took place on 27 June 1991 as part of that year's Irish local elections. 27 councillors were elected from five electoral divisions by PR-STV voting.

Results by party

Results by Electoral Area

Killarney

Killorglin

Listowel

Mid-Kerry

Tralee

External links
 https://opac.oireachtas.ie/knowvation/app/consolidatedSearch/#search/v=grid,c=1,q=qs%3D%5Blocal%20elections%5D%2CqueryType%3D%5B16%5D,sm=s,l=library3_lib
 Official website
 https://irishelectionliterature.com/others-project/old-local-election-results/
 http://irelandelection.com/council.php?elecid=171&tab=constit&detail=yes&electype=5&councilid=12&electype=5

1991 Irish local elections
1991